Frank Ostrowski (born 1960 - died 2011) was a German programmer best known for his implementations of the BASIC programming language.

After his time with the German Federal Armed Forces, Frank Ostrowski was unemployed for three years. During this time, he developed Turbo-Basic XL for the Atari 8-bit family. It was published in the German language yeHappy Computer Magazine in December 1985 (where it became Listing of the Month). Turbo-Basic XL was both much faster and superior to the existing Atari BASIC.

He soon got a job with GFA Systemtechnik GmbH (at the time known as Integral Hydraulik) where he wrote GFA BASIC on the Atari ST which became one of the more popular BASICs on that platform.

Frank Ostrowski died in 2011 after a severe disease.

References

German computer programmers
Atari
2011 deaths
1960 births
BASIC programming language